The 2015 Bromsgrove District Council election took place on 7 May 2015 to elect members of the Bromsgrove Council in England. It was held on the same day as other local elections and the 2015 United Kingdom general election.

Ward results

Alvechurch South

Alvechurch Village

Aston Fields

Avoncroft

Barnt Green & Hopwood

Belbroughton & Romsley

Bromsgrove Central

Catshill North

Catshill South

Charford

Cofton

Drakes Cross

Hagley East

Hagley West

Hill Top

Hollywood

Lickey Hills

Lowes Hill

Marlbrook

Norton

Perryfields

Rock Hill

Rubery North

Rubery South

Sanders Park

Sidemoor

Slideslow

Tardebigge

Wythall East

Wythall West

References

2015 English local elections
May 2015 events in the United Kingdom
2015
2010s in Worcestershire